Neogurelca himachala, the crisp-banded hawkmoth, is a moth of the family Sphingidae. It is known from Nepal, north-eastern India, south-western, central and eastern China (including Tibet), northern Thailand, Taiwan, North Korea, South Korea and Japan.

The wingspan is about 34–48 mm. Adults do not fly very much and are active for only a few hours just after day-break and/or at dusk. It is a noisy flyer which can manoeuvre with precision in and out of branches and undergrowth, but which will dart off at high speed if disturbed. It rests among dead leaves or on the bark of trees. Adults of ssp. sangaica are attracted to the flowers of Duranta erecta in Hong Kong

The larvae have been recorded feeding on Paederia foetida in India and Paederia species in China

Subspecies
Neogurelca himachala himachala (Nepal, north-eastern India, south-western China (including Tibet) and northern Thailand)
Neogurelca himachala sangaica Butler, 1876 (central and eastern China, Taiwan, North Korea, South Korea and Japan)

References

Neogurelca
Moths described in 1876
Moths of Japan